Nuguria or the Nuguria Islands, also known as the Abgarris or Fead Islands, are a Polynesian outlier and islands of Papua New Guinea. They are located nearly 150 km from the northern end of Buka island, in the Autonomous Region of Bougainville and consist of two closely spaced atoll formations.

References

External links 
 
 
 Historical commentary from a frequent visitor to Nuguria:  Momentum

Islands of Papua New Guinea
Polynesian outliers